Meall Mor (676 m) is a mountain in the Grampian Mountains of Scotland. It lies above the Glencoe village at the foot of Glen Coe in Lochaber, Scotland.

A flat topped peak with steep and craggy slopes, it is surrounded by mighty Munros, and its summit provides an excellent viewpoint to see its neighbours.

References

Mountains and hills of Highland (council area)
Marilyns of Scotland
Grahams